The Everett Mountains are a mountain range located at Frobisher Bay on southern Baffin Island, Nunavut, Canada. Nunavut's capital city Iqaluit is protected by the Everett Mountains. The mountain range is a subrange of the Arctic Cordillera.

See also
List of mountain ranges

References

Arctic Cordillera
Mountain ranges of Baffin Island